is an action video game developed by CyberConnect2 and published by Capcom. It was first announced at the Tokyo Game Show in 2010, and was released worldwide in February 2012. The game was released on PlayStation 3 and Xbox 360.

The game follows the title character, the demigod Asura as he seeks revenge on the pantheon of other demigods who betrayed him. The story is presented in the style and format of an episodic series of cinematic scenes, including opening and closing credits, with the gameplay being integrated into the cinematic where players switch between third-person combat and interactive sequences with player input in the form of quick-time event button prompts. Because of its unique style, the game has been described in the media as an "interactive anime". According to the game's producer Kazuhiro Tsuchiya, Asura's Wrath takes elements from Hindu and Buddhist mythologies and blends them with science fiction.

Gameplay 

The gameplay of Asura's Wrath is a combination of multiple genres, while overall is presented in the style of an episodic anime series. The gameplay throughout shifts between a third-person action and a rail shooter game. The game also requires the player's direct input during cinematic events in the form of interactive cutscenes with various quick time event and context sensitive button prompts. In all forms of gameplay, however, player progress is determined by two gauges represented at the top of the screen, the life and burst gauge. The life gauge determines the current health and damage taken by the character that if depleted results in a game over/restart screen for that current section. The burst gauge, however, starts empty at the start of every encounter that needs to be charged fully. In order to do this, players must successfully defeat enemies, inflict large amounts of damage and press the current quick-time prompt correctly and in time. Once filled to maximum, players can unleash a powerful burst attack, which in the majority of cases is required in order to finish off strong opponents and advance the plot/gameplay, even commencing another cutscene. In addition to these two gauges, an additional one which is known as the "Unlimited gauge" fills up in a similar way to the burst gauge but instead can be activated to temporally increase the damage that can be inflicted on opponents.

The third-person action sequences resemble "beat 'em up" style gameplay where the player must defeat enemies in close combat, utilizing light and heavy attacks, counters, dashes, and projectiles. While regular light attacks are fast, heavier attacks inflict more damage and can throw back multiple enemies yet can overheat requiring a cool-down period between uses. Players can also perform counter moves if they input the current prompt during an enemy's attack. When an enemy is knocked down, special moves can be performed that further help fills the burst gauge. If however the player character is knocked back, they have a chance to quickly recover by landing on their feet and saving additional health. The rail shooter portion of the gameplay involves the player character moving yet on a fixed axis, being only able to move to dodge and maneuver against incoming attack and obstacles, all the while locking on and firing upon enemies.

The interactive cutscene element is integrated with the gameplay, however. Correct inputs when prompted will advance the story while failure can cause the restart of a sequence and damage to health in a previous gameplay sequence. While a few sequences may continue regardless, certain quick-time events have degrees of success where the player may attempt to press at an even more specific time than when the prompt immediately and initially appears. For example, a press too early or later might register a merely "good" or "great" while the exact correct moment will register as "excellent". The player's performance in this aspect, along with the time taken to complete and overall damage inflicted is graded at the end of each episode, with the highest grade being an "S Rank". At least 5 S Ranks or completing 50 episodes unlock the final hidden "true ending" of the game.

Presentation 
Each level is played out like an episode more akin to an anime television series, with subtle introductory and closing credits at the start and end of each episode. This is then followed by a brief promo with cut together footage for the next episode, along with a narration recapping and foreshadowing upcoming events. In between episodes, there are also snippets of additional narrative and back story that are presented in the form of a series of illustrations, with each different segment drawn by a different credited artist. The entire "series" is split into four chapters, each cutscene is overlaid with lengthier production credits.

Plot

The story takes place on Gaea, a world inhabited by human tribes, supernaturals, and gods. The game opens as the world is under attack by a demonic, destructive race known as the Gohma. Attempting to "purify" Gaea of their presence, the group of powerful and technologically advanced god-like cyborgs known as the Eight Guardian Generals, commanded by Emperor Strada of the nation of Shinkoku, lead an immense fleet of warships to fight the Gohma. The protagonist Asura is one of these generals along with his mentor Augus, his rival/brother-in-law Yasha, and his allies Olga, Sergei, Wyzen, Kalrow and Deus, the leader of the generals. As the generals engage in battle with the Gohma, Asura's daughter Mithra acts as the priestess of Shinkoku to empower him and the other generals through the power of Mantra, a cosmic energy collected with the prayers of their human worshipers and distilled through Mithra. The generals eventually confront the Gohma's source Vlitra, who literally tears open the planet when it reveals itself. While only subdued by Asura, the generals claim victory over Vlitra. Back on Gaea, Asura reunites with Mithra and his wife and Yasha's sister Durga before he is summoned by the Emperor only to find him dead upon arrival, the arriving guards accusing him of regicide and treason. A distraught Asura flees the palace after being forced to defend himself from Wyzen, returning to find Durga fatally wounded, revealing Mithra was kidnapped before she dies in his arms. Asura eventually locates Mithra, who is guarded by the other generals, but he is sent to his death by Deus, who reveals himself as the Emperor's murderer and claims he will use Mithra to "save the world".

Asura finds himself in the limbo of Naraka, where a mysterious Golden Spider goads him into regaining his memories and climbing back into the mortal world. When he returns, 12,000 years have passed and Gaea has become a barren wasteland, with the Gohma still causing destruction across the planet. He soon confronts Wyzen, who claims that the remaining generals have become the Seven Deities through the power of Mantra, which they collect with the souls of their worshipers. Filled with rage upon remembering his past, Asura channels Mantra on his own a feat the Deities thought impossible and destroys Wyzen in a long battle at the cost of his arms. However, Yasha arrives and easily kills Asura, sinking his body into molten lava.

Another 500 years pass and Asura's body has been excavated and worshiped by a small village, coming back to life as he encounters a young girl resembling Mithra. Not long after, Kalrow arrives and begins blatantly killing humans for Mantra. Asura manages to destroy Kalrow's fleet, learning from Kalrow that Deus intends to wipe out the Gohma for good, before crushing the pleading deity to death inside his own escape pod. Following this, Asura falls back to earth where he encounters Augus, who convinces him to drink and relax in a hot spring before they duel on the moon. Though Augus has the upper hand and impales Asura with his sword, Asura manages to break the sword, grabs the broken half with his teeth and uses it to gut Augus, who dies satisfied with the duel. Asura returns to the village with the girl from before, but it is bombarded by another fleet led by Olga. While Asura survives, he discovers the girl has been killed; overwhelmed with rage, Asura transforms into a demonic version of himself powerful enough to wipe out most of the armada. Olga then resorts to using the deities' planet sized super-weapon, the Brahmastra, but Yasha tries to stop the weapon from firing, believing that the thousands of souls used to power it would be wasted on Asura. He manages to stop the weapon in mid-fire, but Asura goes missing in the blast.

Following his actions, Deus orders Yasha, under the supervision of Sergei, to strike at the Gohma attacking a human city. Despite Yasha's best efforts to purify the Gohma and halt their advance, Sergei bombards both them and the city for more souls. As Yasha has commanded from space most of the time, he only now realizes the needless mass slaughter of humans for Mantra. Asura then reappears, still consumed by rage, and kills Sergei, but not before he reveals himself as Durga's murderer, something Yasha knew all along, yet still chose to side with Deus. Realizing Asura has become uncontrollable with rage, Yasha manages to subdue him and revert him back to his normal state as the two of them travel to Deus's ship. They confront Deus, where Yasha states that the deities' cause is worthless if trillions had to die in the process while also at the cost of Mithra's own suffering, shown to be drained of the Mantra she can collect and manipulate. Deus explains that he only betrayed the Emperor when he brushed off Deus's concerns over Vlitra's inevitable return. Both Asura and Yasha battle Deus and barely manage to defeat him. Before he dies, Deus claims with his last breath that only he could save Gaea, whereupon Vlitra returns once more, larger and more powerful than before. Asura and Yasha charge into battle against Vlitra despite being greatly outclassed, but Mithra aids them through Mantra empowerment,  allowing them to break into Vlitra's center and destroy its core. While Asura does not know if it was truly defeated, he and Yasha return to Deus's ship and reunite with Mithra.

In the subsequent DLC Episodes, Olga reappears, unhinged by Deus's death, and attempts to kill Mithra in front of Asura and Yasha. However, the Golden Spider intervenes and kills Olga before taking residence in Mithra's body, sealing her away while revealing his true formChakravartin, the Lord of Creation. Chakravartin states that it was he who unleashed the Gohma upon Gaea in order to test Asura as a worthy inheritor of Gaea. Asura and Yasha attack Chakravartin only to find themselves outmatched and sent falling back to the planet, with Chakravartin proclaiming he will destroy the world and remake it once more. Settling things with Asura in a final duel, Yasha sacrifices himself to give his friend his Mantra Core and the Brahmastra's Mantra Reactor, allowing Asura to channel and control Mantra without destroying his body. Chakravartin fires a doomsday blast at Gaea but Asura deflects it after he flies into space and assumes a massive, near-godly form called Asura the Destructor. Asura engages Chakravartin in a battle that causes the very fabric of time and space to come apart with all of creation, eventually bringing down Chakravartin by sheer force of will. Before Asura can finish him, Mithra breaks free and urges him to stop, she warns him if Chakravartin is killed, all mantra and mantra-powered beings will cease to exist, including Asura himself. Asura chooses to destroy Chakravartin nonetheless, satisfied so long as Mithra can live free from danger. As the landscape around him collapses, Asura shares his final words with Mithra and vanishes, finally free of wrath. Mithra returns to Gaea, where she integrates with the surviving humans, spending many years recounting the tales of her father to the mortal children on Gaea.

The epilogue fast-forwards to 870 million years later, where a society resembling the present-day has arisen. Asura is immortalized in the form of a great statue resembling the Statue of Liberty, sitting in the bay outside a large city resembling New York City. Asura, Durga, Mithra, and the others have all been reincarnated as humans, living out happy lives still remarkably similar to their old incarnations: an angry father (Asura) beats up a fat pedestrian (Wyzen) for accidentally knocking his daughter (Mithra) over, his wife (Durga) gently scolds her husband while the daughter admires her father's strength and fearlessness.  A police officer (Chun-Li) chases an old man speeding along on a Segway (Kalrow) beneath a billboard showing off a video from a famous singer and model (Sergei). A Japanese man (Augus) tries to find a Japanese restaurant, but struggles to communicate with the locals. A rich businessman (Deus) opts to be late for an important meeting in order to help an old man (Strada) cross the street, while scolding his secretary (Olga) for trying to rush them along. The family meets up with the brooding uncle (Yasha) who still has issues with the angry fool his sister married, the subject of an ongoing rivalry between the brothers-in-law. As the family is reunited for a day on the town, a giant meteor appears in the sky and begins hurtling towards the city. While the others flee for shelter, the now-mortal Asura steps out into the middle of the street, bracing himself and clenching his fists, prepared to fight once again.

Development 
Asura's Wrath began development in 2007. The development team wanted to create a game that everyone could understand. In an interview, Hiroshi Matsuyama commented on the principles behind the game's creation: "Our main concept was that we wanted to reach out to audiences all over the world with Asura's Wrath. That's why we focused on wrath as our main concept. It's something that anybody can relate to. It's an emotion that's very powerful. It's sometimes seen as negative, but it can be a driving force that helps you overcome any obstacle. When we came up with this backward approach to the development process, first we thought of our focus on wrath, then focused on the story, so we built the story first. Who wrote the story? CyberConnect 2 did, as a group. It was a group effort throughout the dev team, but when we had the story, we passed that on to an actual scriptwriter." In a different interview with Eurogamer, he stated that he was pleased by the site's impression of the game as "completely deranged" and went further into the game's core theme: "In Japanese entertainment and comics, and in games as well, there are many interesting depictions of wrath already – things like Dragon Ball and Naruto – and we love those kinds of comics and games. So we thought, what can we do if we really, really focus on that? How interesting can we make it? That was our challenge to ourselves." The hot spring scene, a very traditional scene for manga and anime in Japanese culture according to Matsuyama, was deliberately placed as a change of pace and a chance for Asura to show a different face to players.

The game was developed on the Unreal Engine 3, which was specially licensed by Capcom for the task, and aided significantly in the development of the game. In an interview, Kazuhiro Tsuchiya stated that "We tried a lot of different options and determined that Unreal Engine 3 was a perfect solution. Our developers were able to review the game in real time, and they continue to be productive throughout the process." Asura's Wrath was first announced during the Tokyo Game Show in September 2010. The announcement trailer showed the title character battle multiple enemies before being confronted by a planetary sized foe. The trailer showed an earlier build that differed from the finished product in multiple aspects. While the character designs and Asian-style art design were similar, even identical in certain regards, the tone and combat was more violent and bloody, showing a greater emphasis on the combat mechanics rather the interactive cinematic features. Following its reveal, Tsuchiya revealed that he felt the game would serve to satisfy fans wanting a sequel to the 2006 PlayStation 2 game God Hand, which was lauded by critics, but failed commercially. He was later pleased that people had seen the deliberate similarities between the two games. A playable demo was released on Xbox Live and PlayStation Network on January 10, 2012.

Downloadable content 
Downloadable content includes a two-dimensional fighting mode using the Street Fighter IV engine, as well as two characters from the game, Ryu/Evil Ryu and Akuma/Oni as opponents. Also, "untold" chapters are included and use hand-drawn animation with quick time events, mostly to fill gaps between the game's chapters. The DLC also allows players to play and see the 'real' ending of the game which is not available from the disc.

Soundtrack 

The game's original soundtrack is scored by Chikayo Fukuda, and was released on March 7, 2012. A track listing has been provided in Japanese. In addition to the lead recording artist, other composers and pieces of music outside of development were involved. Chikayo Fukuda composed the main theme and its variation, entitled "In Your Belief" while the vocalized version was sung by Tomoyo Mitani. The game also featured Antonín Dvořák's Symphony No. 9 in E Minor From the New World in the set piece battle between Asura and Augus on the moon.

Track listing

Reception 

The game was received positively by the Japanese gaming magazine Famitsu. The magazine gave the game scores of 10, 10, 9, and 9, each out of 10, adding up to a total of 38 out of 40.

When released in the Western market, the game received "average" reviews on both platforms according to the review aggregation website Metacritic. Many critics praised the story and highlighted the "interactive anime" style as a positive, while others felt it detracted from regular gameplay. In a review for G4TV, Alex Rubens in regards to the episodic narratives stated "I found myself anticipating the next episode as if it were my favorite TV show, making me want to jump right back in and play even more", going on to detail that the story "manages to keep from being predictable by the sheer craziness of the twists that [it] takes." TeamXbox praised the overall presentation as "the best adaptation of the Anime episode structure ever in a videogame", that is suited the characters and overarching narrative. Brad Shoemaker of Giant Bomb praised the game's over the top spectacle, in that the "sheer craziness isn't enough; it's also about the way the craziness is presented. The visuals have a tremendous scale, and the action is masterfully framed by someone who really knows how to work a camera angle."

Critical response to the balance between the "interactive anime" style and gameplay was mixed. Jeff Cork of Game Informer commented that "the combat may not be as deep as other hack and slash offerings, but it does a great job of making Asura feel (and play) like the unhinged demigod", in which he felt the story was the focus rather than the combat, finding it "a nice change of pace from other hack-and-slash games, featuring an interesting story that’s not blocked off by insurmountable difficulty." Keza MacDonald of IGN stated that this unique element was "self-evidently, an excellent thing – and a rare one, if you've been playing games for a long time", praising the presentation in particular, in her opinion calling Asura's Wrath "one of the greatest achievements in Japanese animation in a very long time". Despite this, however, she responded negatively to the longevity, concluding that "as an episodic download release Asura's Wrath would be brilliant, but as a premium-priced game it can only be recommended with strong reservations." In a more critical review, Giancarlo Varanini of GameSpot called the reliance on quick-time events "uninspired" and a "distraction", while also being critical of the difficulty of the combat, in a statement saying, "There's no challenge; no enemies that put up an engaging fight. It's all very safe." GameTrailers echoed this view saying that if approached as a game, Asura's Wrath will leave you wanting, but as a piece of multimedia, it's intriguing.

Luciano Howard of The Digital Fix gave the PS3 version nine out of ten and stated, "Its presentation is fabulous, with letterboxing where needed, colourful and bountiful art and animation, a mix of pastel shading and traditional game colouring mixed together plus awesome sound quality and variation, especially when considering the music which stands out, head and shoulders above the effects. The scale of action is spectacular with opponents larger than a planet and stronger than a god." Liam Martin of Digital Spy gave the same console version four stars out of five and said it was "undoubtedly a niche title, and the lack of extended player input will leave some feeling a little short changed. For those with an appreciation of Eastern animation and quirky video games, however, Asura's Wrath is one of the more intriguing releases of this year, not to mention this console generation." David Jenkins of Metro gave both console versions seven out of ten, calling them "A wonderfully imaginative and beautifully presented interactive anime, but one that cannot maintain a regular enough supply of surprises to justify even its short running time."

Adam Larck of 411Mania gave the Xbox 360 version 6.4 out of 10 and stated, "While it may be different from most games, Asura's Wrath shows that games can be more about storytelling than the game, or at least more of a balance than mainly gameplay with a few cut scenes here and there. Given the shortness of the game, it's at least worth a check out on the weekend, if nothing else." Justin Clouse of The Escapist gave the same console version three stars out of five, calling it "a novel idea with some poor implementation. It often feels strained into too many directions, but there is something undeniably fun about certain outrageous moments. There really isn't much else quite like Asura's Wrath."  Russ Fischer of The A.V. Club gave the PS3 version a C+ and said that it "plays like a tale designed to be experienced in one go. Still, Asura's glowing weak spot is utterly prosaic: price. At $10 or even $20, this could be approached as a diverting experiment. At $60, it's an elixir for only the most obsessive fans of anime storytelling and unusual game design."

Further reading

References

External links 
  
 CyberConnect2's website 
 

2012 video games
Video games about ancient astronauts
Capcom beat 'em ups
CyberConnect2 games
Video games about cyborgs
Episodic video games
Post-apocalyptic video games
PlayStation 3 games
Rail shooters
Science fantasy video games
Unreal Engine games
Video games about revenge
Video games developed in Japan
Video games with downloadable content
Xbox 360 games
Video games based on Buddhist mythology
Video games based on Hindu mythology
Video games based on multiple mythologies
Video games about parallel universes